NGC 187 is a barred spiral galaxy located around 3.2 million light-years away in the constellation Cetus. It was discovered in 1893 by William Herschel.

References

0187
Barred spiral galaxies
Cetus (constellation)
002380